The 1916 George Washington Hatchetites Colonials football team was an American football team that represented George Washington University as an independent during the 1916 college football season. In their first season under head coach Thomas Sullivan, the team compiled a 3–3–1 record.

Schedule

References

George Washington
George Washington Colonials football seasons
George Washington Hatchetites football